Israel Yinon (11 January 1956 – 29 January 2015) was an Israeli conductor. He was a guest conductor with numerous orchestras around the world, including the Royal Philharmonic and the Vienna Symphony. He specialized in reviving works of forgotten German composers who were forbidden under Adolf Hitler.

Yinon died after collapsing onstage during a youth concert at the Lucerne University of Applied Sciences and Arts in Switzerland. He was 59.

References

External links

1956 births
2015 deaths
Israeli conductors (music)
Israeli Jews
Conductors (music) who died while conducting
People from Kfar Saba
20th-century conductors (music)
21st-century conductors (music)